Divine Yelsarmba Naah (born 20 April 1996) is a Ghanaian footballer who currently plays as an attacking midfielder.

Career
Naah signed for Manchester City in July 2014, and was immediately loaned out for 6 months to Strømsgodset. He made his debut for Strømsgodset on 20 September 2014 in the 4–0 win against Bodø/Glimt, when he came on as a substitute in the 87th minute.

He signed for NAC Breda on an 18-month loan on 1 February 2015. He scored his first goal for the club on 25 May 2015, dribbling past 2 defenders before placing the ball in the net. This was a crucial goal in the Jupiler Play Offs in order to avoid relegation from the Dutch first league Eredivisie.

Naah subsequently spent loan periods at FC Nordsjælland, Örebro SK and Tubize, joining the latter club permanently after his Manchester City contract ended.

On 27 June 2019, Naah signed to the Israeli Premier League club Hapoel Ra'anana. In 2021 he first played for Mosta, then Kauno Žalgiris. He scored his first goal for Kauno in July 2021 against Europa in the UEFA Europa Conference League qualifying.

Career statistics

References 

1996 births
Living people
Ghanaian footballers
Right to Dream Academy players
Manchester City F.C. players
Strømsgodset Toppfotball players
NAC Breda players
FC Nordsjælland players
Örebro SK players
A.F.C. Tubize players
Hapoel Ra'anana A.F.C. players
Mosta F.C. players
Eliteserien players
Eredivisie players
Eerste Divisie players
Danish Superliga players
Allsvenskan players
Challenger Pro League players
Israeli Premier League players
Maltese Premier League players
A Lyga players
Ghanaian expatriate footballers
Expatriate footballers in Norway
Expatriate footballers in the Netherlands
Expatriate footballers in Belgium
Expatriate men's footballers in Denmark
Expatriate footballers in Sweden
Expatriate footballers in Israel
Expatriate footballers in Malta
Expatriate footballers in Lithuania
Ghanaian expatriate sportspeople in Norway
Ghanaian expatriate sportspeople in the Netherlands
Ghanaian expatriate sportspeople in Belgium
Ghanaian expatriate sportspeople in Denmark
Ghanaian expatriate sportspeople in Sweden
Ghanaian expatriate sportspeople in Israel
Ghanaian expatriate sportspeople in Malta
Ghanaian expatriate sportspeople in Lithuania
Association football midfielders